C. trifolii  may refer to:
 Coleophora trifolii, the trefoil thick-horned tinea or large clover case-bearer, a moth species found in Europe, North Africa, Asia Minor, Afghanistan and North America
 Colletotrichum trifolii, a fungal plant pathogen of alfalfa
 Curvularia trifolii, a plant pathogen
 Cymadothea trifolii, a fungal plant pathogen